Mississippi River bridge collapse may refer to:

 The collapse of the I-35W Mississippi River bridge in 2007
 The collapse of a section of the Lake Street-Marshall Bridge in 1989